Royalton Airport , is located in Gasport, New York, United States.

Facilities and Aircraft
Royalton Airport is situated one mile southeast of the central business district, and contains one runway.

For the 12-month period ending September 8, 2008, the airport had 6,084 aircraft operations, an average of 117 per week: 82% local general aviation, 16% transient general aviation, and 2% military. At that time there were 43 aircraft based at this airport: 86% single-engine, 5% multi engine, 7% ultralight, and 2% helicopter.

References

Airports in New York (state)